Siruvalur may refer to:

 Siruvalur (Ariyalur), a village in Ariyalur district, Tamil Nadu, India
 Siruvalur (Gobi), a village in Erode District, Tamil Nadu, India